Luna crater is an impact crater at Luna village in Bhuj taluka of Kutch district of Gujarat, India. The crater is located in a low-lying, soft, flat area and appears unconventional and deceptive when compared to other craters in India, which are usually found on hard, rocky surfaces.

Description 

Rock fragments and glasslike materials found at the site indicate a meteorite impact, the date of which has tentatively been put at around 2000 BCE.

Crater is visibly a kilometre wide, but the satellite radar imagery shows it is spread over a five kilometres radius. Since it lacks the characteristics of a typical impact site, it is a unique site in the world, it has a very low depth to diameter ratio. A round lake of 1 km2 in area and 2 meter in depth lies in the centre of crater, which remains dry during summers. Crater depression is covered with thick vegetation of thorny Acacia species (Acacia nilotica and Prosopis juliflora). Rim of the crater, with up-turned beds and shutter cone, has no hard rocks. X-ray analysis of the materials adhering to meteorite fragments carried out by George Mathew, Earth Science Department, the Indian Institute of Technology Bombay revealed stishovite and coesite, the high pressure polymorphs of silica, which confirms the impact origin of the crater.

Among the various objects/products expected in an impact site, fragments appearing like metallic meteorites that are dark, heavy and magnetic with spherical cavities are found at the rim of the suspected crater, and glassy objects comparable to tektites have been recovered.

Religious significance 
Luna Dham Temple lies in the north end of the crater.

More potential craters in Kutch 

The satellite data indicates that there could be a few more craters within the Kutch, which are hidden by the subsequent denudational activities.

See also 

 Impact craters in India
 Dhala crater in Shivpuri district of Madhya Pradesh
 Lonar crater at Lonar in Buldhana district of Maharashtra
 Ramgarh Crater in Mangrol tehsil of Baran district of Rajasthan
 Shiva crater, an undersea super crater west of India

 Other related topics
 List of impact craters on Earth
 List of possible impact structures on Earth
 List of lakes in India
 List of national parks of India
 Ramsar Convention
 Soda lake

References

National Geological Monuments in India
Landforms of Gujarat
Impact craters of India